On November 3, 2020, the District of Columbia held elections for several local and federal government offices. Its primary elections were held on June 2, 2020. 

In addition to the U.S. presidential race voters elected one of its two shadow senators, its nonvoting member of the House of Representatives and 6 of 13 seats on the council. There is also one ballot measure which was voted on.

Federal elections

President of the United States

Washington, D.C., has 3 electoral votes in the Electoral College. The district has leaned heavily Democratic in each presidential election since 1964, the first one in which its population was able to vote.

United States House of Representatives

Eleanor Holmes Norton ran for re-election as a non-voting delegate to the House of Representatives.

Shadow Senator

Incumbent Paul Strauss was re-elected to a sixth term as a shadow senator.

Shadow Representative

Incumbent Franklin Garcia declined to run for re-election. Democrat Oye Owolewa, independent Sohaer Syed, and Statehood Green Joyce Robinson-Paul competed for his open seat.

District elections

Council

Ballot measure
Initiative 81, titled the Entheogenic Plants and Fungus Policy Act of 2020, aims to decriminalize noncommercial cultivation, distribution and possession of psychedelic plants, including psilocybin mushrooms, iboga, cacti containing mescaline, and ayahuasca.

Polling

Result

Notes

Partisan clients

References

Further reading

External links
 DC Board of Elections
 
 
  (Affiliate of the U.S. League of Women Voters)
 
 

 
Washington, D.C.
Washington, D.C.